BA Limited, trading as Basketball Australia, is a not-for-profit company promoting basketball in Australia at all levels. It is recognised by FIBA as the national body organising international basketball in Australia.

It is funded through membership, sponsorship, fund raising and government grants. It sanctions Australia's two professional competitions, the National Basketball League (NBL), which it previously owned, and the Women's National Basketball League (WNBL) as well as the semi-professional leagues that were once part of the Australian Basketball Association (ABA). Basketball Australia also fields representative teams in FIBA and Olympic competition. It operates its National Intensive Training Centre Program and it's Aussie Hoops program is a grass roots program for primary school children launched in 2002. It provides juniors with the opportunity to compete in national representative competitions from the U16 age group, with the National Junior Championships providing a high level of competition between state teams.  U14 Club Championships and the National Schools Basketball Tournament provide elite level competition for younger players.

History
Its predecessor, the Australian Basketball Federation was formed in 1939 and constituted in 1946, became a member of FIBA in 1949 and was incorporated in 1982.. After a succession of national basketball organisations, the current company operating as Basketball Australia was registered in 1996. 

Jo Juler became its chief executive in 2021.

National Teams

  Each national team and their performance at the most recent international events are listed above.

Leagues

Men

Women

Partnership with Japan
Since 2018, there has been an ongoing partnership with the Japan Basketball Association.

See also

 Australia men's national basketball team
 Australia women's national basketball team
 Basketball in Australia
 List of Australian NBA players
 List of Australian WNBA players
 National Basketball League
 NBL1
 Women's National Basketball League

References

External links
 

Australia
 
1939 establishments in Australia
Sports organizations established in 1939